Kris Allen Fredheim (born February 23, 1987) is a Canadian former professional ice hockey defenseman. He has previously played with the Minnesota Wild of the National Hockey League (NHL). He was selected by the Vancouver Canucks in the sixth round (185th overall) of the 2005 NHL Entry Draft.

Playing career
Kris played collegiate hockey at Colorado College of the Western Collegiate Hockey Association.

On November 16, 2011, the Minnesota Wild signed Fredheim to a two-year entry level contract. On November 17, 2011, he made his National Hockey League debut recording 10:13 of ice time for the Wild.

On September 23, 2013, Fredheim was signed to a one-year AHL contract with the St. John's IceCaps for the 2013–14 season. He appeared in two seasons with the IceCaps, serving as an alternate captain in his final professional season in 2014–15.

Career statistics

Regular season and playoffs

International

Awards and honours

References

External links

1987 births
Living people
Canadian ice hockey defencemen
Colorado College Tigers men's ice hockey players
Houston Aeros (1994–2013) players
Ice hockey people from British Columbia
Minnesota Wild players
Notre Dame Hounds players
People from Campbell River, British Columbia
St. John's IceCaps players
Vancouver Canucks draft picks
Victoria Salmon Kings players